

QJ54A Drugs for mycobacterial infections

QJ54AB Antibiotics
QJ54AB02 Rifampicin
QJ54AB03 Rifamycin

References

J54